Willi Krakau (4 December 1911, Felgeleben (now Schönebeck) – 26 April 1995) was a racing driver from Germany. During the late 1940s and early 1950s, he built a reputation as a constructor of special racing cars, sometimes based on the BMW 328, with which he enjoyed some success in various formulae including Formula Two.

His single entry into a World Championship race was at the 1952 German Grand Prix. Driving his six-cylinder AFM car, he completed the qualifying sessions but did not appear on the starting grid.

Prior to his motor racing exploits, Krakau had tried his hand at several sports, and was a member of the German rowing team at the 1936 Summer Olympics.

Krakau died in Peine in 1995.

Complete World Championship results
(key)

References
Article at 8W

1911 births
1995 deaths
People from Peine (district)
German racing drivers
German Formula One drivers
AFM Formula One drivers
Racing drivers from Lower Saxony